Juan Vicente Lezcano López (5 April 1937 – 6 February 2012); was a Paraguayan football defender.

Career
Lezcano was born in the neighbourhood of Santísima Trinidad in Asunción, Paraguay, and started his career at Olimpia of Asunción in 1954. He was part of the historical Olimpia team coached by Aurelio González that won five Paraguayan league championships in a row, from 1956 to 1960 and reached the final of the first edition of the Copa Libertadores in 1960, where Olimpia lost against Peñarol of Uruguay. Soon after in 1961, Peñarol signed him and became one of the key players of the Uruguayan club along with other stars such as Alberto Spencer, Pedro Rocha and Ladislao Mazurkiewicz that helped Peñarol win several national and international championships. In 1968, he played for Colón de Santa Fe of Argentina.

Lezcano made 26 appearances for the Paraguay national football team, and was part of the squad that qualified for the 1958 World Cup tournament.

Lezcano's father, Juan Félix Lezcano, was also a Paraguayan international footballer.

References

External links

1937 births
2012 deaths
Sportspeople from Asunción
Paraguayan footballers
Paraguayan expatriate footballers
Paraguay international footballers
1958 FIFA World Cup players
Club Olimpia footballers
Peñarol players
Club Atlético Colón footballers
Expatriate footballers in Argentina
Expatriate footballers in Uruguay
Paraguayan expatriate sportspeople in Argentina
Paraguayan expatriate sportspeople in Uruguay
Association football defenders